A multi-gigabit transceiver (MGT) is a SerDes capable of operating at serial bit rates above 1 Gigabit/second. MGTs are used increasingly for data communications because they can run over longer distances, use fewer wires, and thus have lower costs than parallel interfaces with equivalent data throughput.

Functions
Like other SerDes, the primary function of the MGT is to transmit parallel data as stream of serial bits, and convert the serial bits it receives to parallel data. The most basic performance metric of an MGT is its serial bit rate, or line rate, which is the number of serial bits it can transmit or receive per second. Although there is no strict rule, MGTs can typically run at line rates of 1 Gigabit/second or more.
MGTs have become the 'data highways' for data processing systems that demand a high in/out raw data input and output (e.g. video processing applications). They are becoming very common on FPGA - such programmable logic devices being especially well fitted for parallel data processing algorithms.

Beyond serialization and de-serialization, MGTs must incorporate a number of additional technologies to allow them to operate at high line rates. Some of these are listed below:

Signal integrity and jitter
Signal integrity is critical for MGTs due to their high line rates. The quality of a given high-speed link is characterized by the bit error ratio (BER) of the connection (the ratio of bits received in error to total bits received), and jitter.

BER and jitter are functions of the entire MGT connection, including the MGTs themselves, their serial lines, their reference clocks, their power supplies, and the digital systems that create and consume their parallel data. As a result, MGTs are often measured by how little jitter they transmit (Jitter Transfer/Jitter Generation), and how much jitter they can tolerate before their BER is too high (Jitter Tolerance). These measurements are commonly taken using a BERT, and analyzed using an eye diagram.

Other considerations
Some other metrics for MGTs include:
 Maximum run length before loss of CDR lock
 Power consumption
 Flexibility (e.g. multiple line rates, multiple encodings)
 Differential swing (max differential signal the MGT can drive)
 Receiver sensitivity (min differential signal the MGT can detect)
 Common-mode rejection ratio

Protocols that use MGTs
MGTs are used in the implementation of the following serial protocols:
 
 2.5GBASE-T and 5GBASE-T
 10 Gigabit Ethernet
 Aurora
 CEI-6G
 CPRI
 Fibre Channel
 Gigabit Ethernet
 GPON
 HD-SDI
 CoaXPress
 Infiniband
 Interlaken
 OBSAI
 PCI Express
 SAS (Serial Attached SCSI)
 Serial ATA
 SerialLite
 Serial RapidIO
 SFI-5
 SONET/SDH
 XAUI

References
 High Speed Digital Design, Johnson & Graham
 Signal Integrity Simplified, Bogatin
 Handbook of Digital Techniques for High Speed Design, Granberg
 Jitter
 FPGA blog : using multi-gigabit transceivers to test and debug FPGA

External links
 Xilinx Aurora (Xilinx Inc.) 
 Serial Multi-Protocol Transmission with the LatticeSC FPGA (Lattice Semiconductor)
 Virtex-5 RocketIO GTP Transceiver User Guide (Xilinx Inc.)
 Stratix II GX Transceiver User Guide (Altera Inc.)

Telecommunications equipment